Szabolcs Szegletes (born 19 July 1978) is a Hungarian footballer who played for BVSC Budapest as striker.

References
 Futballévkönyv 1999 [Football Yearbook 1999], Volume I, pp. 78–82., Aréna 2000 kiadó, Budapest, 2000 

1978 births
Living people
Hungarian footballers
Association football forwards
Budapesti VSC footballers
People from Veszprém
Sportspeople from Veszprém County